The Made in Denmark Challenge is a golf tournament on the Challenge Tour. It was first played in May 2015 at the Royal Golf Club in Copenhagen, Denmark. It moved to Aalborg Golf Club in 2016, Royal Oak Golf Club in 2017, Himmerland Golf & Spa Resort in 2018 and Silkeborg Ry Golfklub in 2019.

Max Orrin won the inaugural event at Royal Golf Club, Copenhagen, beating Andrew McArthur by a stroke.

Winners

Notes

References

External links
Coverage on the Challenge Tour's official site

Challenge Tour events
Golf tournaments in Denmark
Sport in Copenhagen
Recurring sporting events established in 2015
2015 establishments in Denmark